Jeff Elbel is an American musician, songwriter, and producer, currently based near Chicago, Illinois. He is also a frequent journalist for publications including the Chicago Sun-Times. He runs a recording studio and is included in many bands, one of these being "Jeff Elbel+Ping". He is also included in Tom Sharpe's band.

Discography
Jeff Elbel + Ping: Gallery (Marathon Records) (2012) 
Jeff Elbel + Ping: Peanut Gallery EP (Marathon Records) (2011) 
Jeff Elbel + Ping: The Eleventh Hour Storybook (Marathon Records ) (2005) 
Jeff Elbel + Ping: The Eleventh Hour Songbook (Marathon Records) (2004)  
Jeff Elbel + Ping: Engine of Destruction (Bootleg Live Records) (2004)  
Jeff Elbel + Ping: Loyal to You (Marathon Records) (2003)  
Jeff Elbel + Ping: Suffer the Children, Compilation memorial with Theo Obrastoff 2003
Jeff Elbel + Ping: "You Still Believe in Me"/Making God Smile (Silent Planet) (2002)  
Jeff Elbel + Ping: No Outlet (Marathon Records) (2001)  
Jeff Elbel + Ping: Live at the Crooked Bar (2000)  
Jeff Elbel + Ping: "We the Living"/We the Living, Vol. III (True Tunes) (2000)  
Jeff Elbel + Ping: "Hell Oh"/When Worlds Collide (Stunt Records) (2000)  
Jeff Elbel + Ping: "Miracle Rain"/RIM v.beta (Bigwig Enterprises) (1999)  
Jeff Elbel + Ping: "Hell Oh"/When Worlds Collide: A Tribute to Daniel Amos (1999) 
Jeff Elbel + Ping: "Miracle Rain" (instrumental)/Looper's Delight, Volume II (Bigwig Enterprises) (1999)  
Ping/Aunt Bettys: "Popsicle Stick"/Ford Supersonic (Marathon/Ear Pistol Records) (1998)  

Tom Sharpe: Lifting the World (Sharpe World Music) (2014)  
Mumble: "Happy Living" (Marathon Records) (2010)  
North: Drowning In Sky (North Records) (2008)  
King Never: Orphans, Misfits, & Fragments (Marathon Records) (2006)  
Andrewesley: Strength (Marathon Records) (2004)  
Andrewesley: All I Wanted to Say EP (Kastra Records) (2004) 
Aaron Sprinkle: The Boy Who Stopped the World (Silent Planet) (2003) 
Hopescope: Bring in the Sun (Marathon Records) (2003)  
D.A.S.: Saving Grace (Galaxy21) (2003)  
Phil Madeira: "It'll Do For Now"/Live from the Acoustic Stage (Silent Planet) (2002) 
D.A.S.: Jesus Wants You to Buy this Record (independent) (2002)  
D.A.S.: "Christmas"/A Live Tribute Recording for Gene Eugene (Floodgate Records) (2000) 
EDL: Moment of Clarity (KMG Records) (1999)  
LSU: Dogfish Jones (Platinum Entertainment) (1998)  
Blackball: "Message in a Bottle"/The Mother of all Tribute Albums (HM Records) (1998)  
Farewell to Juliet: "Chase the Kangaroo"/To Cover You (Addeybug Records) (unreleased)  
Farewell to Juliet: Grace and Dire Circumstances (Marathon Records) (1998)  
Sunny Day Roses: "Pop"/Courting Courtney (film soundtrack) (1998)  
Jeff Elbel: "Miracle Rain (instrumental)"/Looper's Delight, Vol. II (Marathon Records) (1998)  
Sunny Day Roses: "You Know What to Do"/RIM: v.beta (Bigwig Entertainment) (1997)  
Jeff Elbel: "Miracle Rain"/RIM: v.beta (Bigwig Entertainment) (1997)  
Blackball: Hope (Metro One Records) (1997)  
Sunny Day Roses: Bloomshine! (Marathon Records) (1996)  
Farewell to Juliet: "Sorrow and Pride"/Tastes Like Chicken (Mootown Records) (1994)  
Farewell to Juliet: Echoes of Laughter (Marathon Records) (1993)

References

External links
 Jeff Elbel

Living people
American male songwriters
Chicago Sun-Times people
Year of birth missing (living people)